Carlos Alberto Ramírez Yepes (born 12 March 1994) is a BMX rider, bronze medalist in BMX at the Rio 2016 Olympic Games and also a bronze medal in Tokyo 2020.

Biography 
Carlos started cycling at a very young age at the initiative of his parents. Over the years, he practiced various disciplines such as basketball and swimming until he found his sport: BMX. He started in the hotbeds of this sport in the city of Medellín, the same day that he turned five years old.

In the world of two wheels he is known by the nickname -The Little Magician-, for his agility and ability on the bicycle.

Participation in olympics 
First Latin American male bicyclist in BMX, to achieve two Olympic bronze medals.

Rio de Janeiro 2016 Olympic Games, in an exciting photo finish after starting in the last position in the starter, he managed to gain positions taking advantage of the tight corners very well and thus get the final podium.

 

Then it would be in Tokyo 2020 (31 July 2021), with some quite emotional and dangerous preliminaries, thanks to the rain that made the track quite smooth, but that was not an impediment for the "little magician". He topped each of the rankings for two days and after a frenzied final, he was able to claim his second Olympic bronze medal.

BMX World Championship (Brazil 2002) 
Almost 20 years have passed since the first BMX Cycling World Championship won by Carlos Ramírez, in Paulina, Brazil. At that time, "The Little Wizard" was only eight years old and surprised the world of BMX with his nerves of steel, which would lead him in that month of July 2002 to be crowned UCI BMX World Champion in Brazil.

BMX World Championship (UK 2012) 
In 2012 he attended his first BMX Cycling World Championship in the junior men's category and was crowned World Champion in Birmingham (United Kingdom). In that same championship he obtained second place in the junior men's time trial modality. Carlos is part of the new generation of national BMX, with the new gold medal in the most important BMX tournament in the world.

Best participations in BMX World Championships

Best participations in BMX World Cups 
Group of races in the Elite category, which allows athletes to maintain activity and competition during the Olympic cycles.

UCI BMX individual historical ranking 
It is the sum of all the races that are run in the year endorsed by the UCI and according to these points the places of participation for the following year's World Championship are awarded.

New bike for Tokyo 2020 
(14 July 2021) GW Bicycles, the brand that sponsors the bicycles used by "El Pequeno Mago" and the Colombian BMX team, has designed the so-called "MARCO G1 +" in conjunction with the Olympic athletes. More information on GW Bicycles Instagram

New recognitions 
The Mayor's Office of Bogotá changed the name of its BMX track in Parque El Salitre, the best in Colombia, to be called: Carlos Ramírez BMX Track.

Motion of Honor and decoration Republic of Colombia

The latest from Carlos Ramírez Yepes 
Bronze medal in BMX, Tokyo 2020 Olympics(30 July 2021)

Links:

(14 July 2021) GW Bicycles, the brand that sponsors the bicycles used by "Te Little Wizard " and the Colombian BMX team, has designed the so-called "G1+ Frame" in conjunction with Olympic athletes.

Carlos Ramírez's official titles are here: InTheSports.org

References

External links
 
 
 
 
 

1994 births
Living people
Colombian male cyclists
BMX riders
Olympic cyclists of Colombia
Olympic medalists in cycling
Olympic bronze medalists for Colombia
Cyclists at the 2016 Summer Olympics
Cyclists at the 2020 Summer Olympics
Medalists at the 2016 Summer Olympics
Medalists at the 2020 Summer Olympics
Pan American Games competitors for Colombia
Cyclists at the 2015 Pan American Games
Cyclists at the 2019 Pan American Games
Sportspeople from Medellín
Place of birth missing (living people)
Competitors at the 2014 Central American and Caribbean Games
Competitors at the 2018 Central American and Caribbean Games
21st-century Colombian people
South American Games medalists in cycling
South American Games bronze medalists for Colombia
Competitors at the 2018 South American Games